Johannes Flintoe (1786/87, Copenhagen - 27 January 1870, Copenhagen) was a Danish-born painter of Norwegian ancestry. He is known for his landscapes, costume studies and historical scenes. His works play a significant role in the transition to romantic nationalism.

Biography
His family (originally "Flinthoug") came from Hurum and his father was a metal caster. At the age of thirteen, he was apprenticed to a master decorative painter named Pader Faxøe, who became his foster father. In 1802, he began studies at the Royal Danish Academy of Fine Arts, which he completed in 1805. During this time, he also took private lessons in decorative and theatrical painting. From 1807 to 1808, he served in the Napoleonic Wars and developed rheumatism, which would create health issues for the rest of his life.

In 1811, he was named a master painter in the Copenhagen guild and moved to Christiania (Oslo), to join his brother Jacob, who had become established there as a master mason. He worked as a decorator until he took a teaching position at the newly created Norwegian National Academy of Craft and Art Industry in 1819. During his tenure there, he travelled extensively throughout Norway, visiting Telemark, Hardanger, Trøndelag and other scenic locations, painting local costumes as well as landscapes.

He also accompanied Gerhard Munthe on a mapping expedition to Aurland and, together with Wilhelm Maximilian Carpelan, made some of the first drawings of the Jotunheimen mountains. One of his most popular works is the "Fugleværelset" (Bird Room), a waiting room at the Royal Palace, painted to give the illusion that one is looking at landscapes and the sky from an open pavilion. From 1842 to 1851, he was on the board of the National Gallery.

Many of his sketches and paintings were published from 1838 to 1840 with text by Maurits Hansen. Among his best-known students were Hans Gude and Johan Frederik Eckersberg. In 1851, he returned to Copenhagen and lived on a pension. By 1866, his health had deteriorated to the point that he had to be cared for by the wife of a former student. He died in 1870.

Selected works

References

Further reading
 Henning Alsvik, Johannes Flintoe. Gyldendal, 1940 
 Noss Aagot, Johannes Flintoes draktakvarellar. Samlaget, 1970 
 Ingrid Lydersen Lystad, Johannes Flintoe og fugleværelset. En reise i norsk natur, historie og egenart. Dreyers forlag, 2015

External links

 Works by Flintoe @ the Vaering Art Gallery.
 Drawings by Flintoe @ the Nasjonal Museet.

1787 births
1870 deaths
Danish romantic painters
Danish expatriates in Norway
Artists from Copenhagen
19th-century Norwegian people
Royal Danish Academy of Fine Arts alumni